Kate Elizabeth Heinzelman is an American attorney serving as the general counsel of the Central Intelligence Agency. She was nominated by President Joe Biden to the position and was confirmed by the Senate on July 14, 2022.

Education 
Heinzelman earned a Bachelor of Arts degree from Yale University and a Juris Doctor from Yale Law School.

Career 
From 2009 to 2010, Heinzelman served as a law clerk for Judge Merrick Garland of the U.S. Court of Appeals for the District of Columbia Circuit. She later clerked for Chief Justice John Roberts at the Supreme Court of the United States. 

In 2012 and 2013, she served as counsel in the United States Department of Justice National Security Division. From 2013 to 2015, she served as Associate White House counsel and assistant to President Barack Obama. From 2015 to 2017, she served as deputy general counsel of the United States Department of Health and Human Services. After the end of the Obama administration, in 2017, Heinzelman joined Sidley Austin as counsel before becoming a partner in 2020.

President Joe Biden announced his nomination of Heinzelman on March 8, 2022 for the position of General Counsel of the Central Intelligence Agency. The United States Senate Select Committee on Intelligence held its open hearing for her nomination on April 6, 2022. On May 10, 2022 the Committee held its closed meeting on the nomination, with chairman Senator Mark Warner favorably reporting the nomination and passing it on to the full Senate. Committee Vice Chair Senator Marco Rubio opposed confirmation.

On July 14, 2022, the United States Senate confirmed her nomination by a 50-41 vote.

References 

Living people
American lawyers
Yale University alumni
Yale Law School alumni
Obama administration personnel
Biden administration personnel
United States Department of Justice officials
United States Department of Justice lawyers
United States Department of Health and Human Services officials
Year of birth missing (living people)
People associated with Sidley Austin